William Edward Vickers (1889–1965) was an English mystery writer better known under his pen name Roy Vickers, but used also the pseudonyms Roy C. Vickers, David Durham, Sefton Kyle, and John Spencer. He is the author of over 60 crime novels and 80 short stories. Vickers is now remembered mostly for his attribution to Scotland Yard of a Department of Dead Ends, specialized in solving old, sometimes long-forgotten cases, mostly by chance encounters of odd bits of strange and apparently disconnected evidence.

He was educated at Charterhouse School, and left Brasenose College, Oxford without a degree. For some time he studied law at the Middle Temple, but never practiced. He married Mary Van Rossem and they had one son. He worked as a journalist, as a court reporter and as a magazine editor; he also wrote a large number of nonfiction articles and sold hundreds of them to newspapers and magazines. Between November 1913 and February 1917, twenty short stories by Vickers were published in the Novel Magazine. About this time he published his first book, a biography of Field Marshal Frederick, Earl Roberts. In 1924 he published The Exploits of Fidelity Dove under the name David Durham, one of the rarest mystery books of the twentieth century. 

In September 1934, The Rubber Trumpet, the first of thirty-eight stories featuring the fictitious Department of Dead Ends, appeared in Pearson's Magazine.
In 1960 he edited the Crime Writers' Association's anthology of short stories Some Like Them Dead. The Manchester Evening News called one of his collections, "one of the half-dozen successful books of detective short stories published since the days of Sherlock Holmes."

Vickers's work has been adapted for film and TV, including Girl in the News (1940), Violent Moment (1959) and three episodes of Alfred Hitchcock Presents (Season 3: 1957–58).

Non-Fiction as Roy Vickers

As Roy Vickers
 Lord Roberts: the Story of His Life (1914)

Novels
 Humbugs Ltd. Serialised, The Novel Magazine, June to October 1914
 Bonnie Mary Myles or The Mystery of Old Monkland (1919). Serialised, Dundee People's Journal, 1919
 The Woman without a Soul (1920)
 The Lady of Lombard Street (1920)
 The Man from Dartmoor. Serialised, Chicago Tribune, 1920
 The Brown Arm. Serialised, Chicago Tribune, 1920
 The Fatal Necklace (1920). Serialised, San Francisco Examiner, 12, 19 and 26 September 1920
 The Thief of Love (1921). Serialised, Dundee Evening Telegraph, 1921
 The Mystery of the Scented Death (1921)
 The Vengeance of Henry Jarroman. Serialised, London Daily Mail, 17 March to 17 May 1921; and Chicago Tribune, 1922
 The Marriage Flaw. Serialised, Chicago Tribune, 1922
 The Door to Desire. Serialised as The Dominant Desire, London Daily Mail, 2 May to 28 June 1922; and Chicago Tribune, 1922
 The Gay Adventure (1922). Serialised, Dundee Evening Telegraph, 1922
 The Woman Accused (1923). Serialised as Suppressed Evidence, London Daily Mail, 14 June 14 to 25 July 1923, and reprinted in other newspapers Dundee Evening Telegraph, 1923
 Ishmael's Wife (1924)
 Murder for a Million (1924)
 The Man in the Shadow. Serialised, Chicago Tribune, 1924
 The Man She Bought. Serialised, San Francisco Examiner, 1924
 Four Past Four (1925). Serialised, Melbourne Herald
 The Pearl-Headed Pin. Serialised, Chicago Tribune, 1925
 The Master of Money. London Daily Mail, 1 July to 19 August 1925
 The Unforbidden Sin (1926). Expanded from the novella qv
 His Other Wife (1926)
 The White Raven (1927). Serialised, London Daily Mail, 17 November 1926 to 25 January 1927
 They Wouldn't Believe. Serialised, Chicago Tribune, 1927
 Seals of Silence. Serialised, San Francisco Examiner, 1928
 Master of Money. Serialised, (Wilkes-Barre) Evening News, 1928
 The Radingham Mystery (1928)
 A Girl of These Days (1929). Serialised as If Love Should Change, 26 November 1928 to 14 January 1929
 The Hawk. Serialised, Chicago Tribune, 1929
 Hidden Gold (1929). Serialised, London Evening News and other newspapers, for example Derby Evening Telegraph, 1929
 The Rose in the Dark (1930). Serialised, Michigan Times Herald, 1930
 The Victim (1930). Serialised, Topical Times, 1930
 The Gold Game (1930)
 Deputy for Cain (1931). Serialised, Melbourne Herald, 1931, as The Deputy for Cain
 The Mystery of the Scented Death (1931)
 The Girl in His Way (1932). Serialised, (Dundee) Sunday Post, 1932
 The Whisperer. Serialised, Chicago Tribune, 1932. Published as The Whispering Death (1947)
 The Marriage for the Defence (1932)
 Bardelow's Heir (1933)
 Swell Garrick. Serialised, Chicago Tribune, 1933
 Money Buys Everything (1934)
 The Forgotten Honeymoon. Serialised, Chicago Tribune, 1934
 Kidnap Island (1934). Serialised, Tit-Bits, 1934
 The Exploits of Fidelity Dove (1935)
 Hide Those Diamonds (1935)
 Four Past Four (1935)
 Too Dangerous to Live (1937). Serialised, Topical Times, 1937
 I'll Never Tell (1937). Serialised, Chicago Tribune, 1936; and Daily Mirror, 1936
 Find This Girl. Serialised (New York) Daily News, 1937
 The Girl in the News (1937)
 The Life Between (1938)
 The Enemy Within (1938)
 Fate Calls the Tune (1939). Serialised, Newcastle Weekly Chronicle, 1939
 The Girl in the Shadows. Serialised, (New York) Daily News, 1940
 She Walked in Fear (1940)
 Playgirl Wanted (1940)
 Brenda Gets Married (1941)
 War Bride (1941)
 Six Came to Dinner (1942)
 A Date with Danger (1942)
 The Girl Who Stood Alone. Serialised, Chicago Tribune, 1942
 The Wicked Mrs Steel. Serialised, Chicago Tribune, 1945
 A King's Ransom. Serialised, (New York) Daily News, 1947
 Murder at Bishop's Runt. (New York) Daily News, 18 and 25 July 1948
 The Department of Dead Ends (1949) – short story collection
 Blackmail. Boston Globe, 9 October 1949
 Death's Warning. Boston Globe, 16 October 1949
 Murder of a Snob (1949)
 Dinner for Two. Boston Globe, 12 February 1950
 Maid to Murder (1950)
 On the Road. Boston Globe, 7 May 1950
 Murdering Mr Velfrage (1950)
 Anointed Quinine. Boston Globe, 4 June 1950
 Gold and Wine (1950)
 They Can't Hang Caroline (1950)
 Murder Will Out (1950) – short story collection
 The Snatch Racket. Boston Globe, 22 April 1951
 The Sole Survivor and The Kynsard Affair (1952)
 The Fire Bug. Philadelphia Inquirer, 21 June 1953
 Eight Murders in the Suburbs (1950) – short story collection
 Double Image (1955) – short story collection
 Seven Chose Murder (1959) – short story collection
 Find the Innocent (1959)
 The Girl Who Wouldn't Talk (1960)
 Best Detective Stories (1965) – short story collection

Short Stories
 The Stolen Melody. Sheffield Weekly Telegraph, 21 June 1913
 Harwood's Discovery. Sheffield Weekly Telegraph, 11 October 1913
 The Goth. The Novel Magazine, November 1913
 The House that Didn't Exist. Sheffield Weekly Telegraph, 22 November 1913
 Duplicates. Pearson's Weekly, [Date to be confirmed], 1913. Reprinted Nebraska State Journal, 25 October 1913
 TITLE UNKNOWN. Chamber's Journal, April 1914
 The Hands of the Clock. The Novel Magazine, July 1915
 Polite Society. The Novel Magazine, October 1915
 Somewhere in London. The Novel Magazine, November 1915
 The Secret Remedy. The Novel Magazine, December 1915
 The Lost Platoons. The Novel Magazine, January 1916
 The Blackleg. Pearson's Weekly, 28 March 1916
 The Unforbidden Sin. The Novel Magazine, March to June 1916. Reprinted: Detective Story Magazine, 23 and 30 October 1917
 Honours Easy. The Novel Magazine, January 1917
 Blackmail. Detective Story Magazine, 11 December 1917
 A Champion of Poverty. Detective Story Magazine, 25 December 1917
 Instinct vs Logic. Detective Story Magazine, 1 January 1918
 A Dicker in Art. Detective Story Magazine, 15 January 1918
 The Man from Dartmoor. Serialised, Topical Times, Vol 1 No 1 (18 October 1919) – DATE OF ISSUE UNKNOWN
 TITLE UNKNOWN. Ideas Magazine, Christmas 1924
 TITLE UNKNOWN. Pearson's Weekly, October 1927
 The Red Ember· Complete Detective Novel Magazine, December 1932
 The Rubber Trumpet. Pearson's Magazine, September 1934
 The Starting-Handle Murder. Pearson's Magazine, October 1934
 The Three-Foot Grave. Pearson's Magazine, November 1934
 TITLE UNKNOWN. Pearson's Magazine, March 1935
 According to Plan. The Thriller, 26 October 1935
 The Notorious Miss Walters. Radio Review No 1, October – November 1935
 The Man Who Murdered in Public. Fiction Parade, 1935
 The Case of Poor Gertrude. Fiction Parade, 1935
 Murder in Mayfair.
 The Yellow Jumper
 The Hen-Pecked Murderer
 A Toy for Jiffy
 The Case of the Social Climber
 A Man and His Mother-in-Law
 The House-in-Your-Hand
 Little Things Like That
 Kill Me, kill My Dog
 The Nine-Pound Murder
 Marion, Come Back
 The parrot's beak
 A fool and her money
 The lady who laughed
 The snob's murder
 The Cowboy of Oxford Street
 The Clue of the Red Carnations
 Blind Man's Buff
 The Meanest Man in Europe
 The Case of the Merry Andrew
 Mean Man's Murder
 The Man Who Was Murdered by a Bed
 The Case of the Honest Murderer
 The Eight Pieces of Tortoiseshell
 Dinner for Two
 The Crocodile Case
 Wit's End
 The Patchwork Murder
 The Man with the Sneer
 The Hair Shirt
 The Man Who Could Not Hold Women
 Miss Paisley's Cat
 Little Things Like That
 The Frame-Up
 The Man Who Punished Himself
 Double Image
 The Color of Truth

As Sefton Kyle

Novels
 The Man in the Shadow (1924)
 Dead Man's Dower (1925)
 Guilty – But (1927)
 The Hawk (1930
 The Bloomsbury Treasure (1930)
 Red Hair (1933)
 The Life He Stole (1933)
 The Man without a Name (1935)
 Silence (1935)
 Number 73 (1936)
 The Durand Case (1936)
 The Notorious Miss Walters (1937)
 The Body in the Safe (1937)
 During Her Majesty's Pleasure (1938)
 Missing (1938)
 Miss X (1939)
 The Judge's Dilemma (1939)
 The Shadow over Fairholme (1940)
 The Girl Known as D13 (1940)
 Sweet Adversity (1941)
 The Price of Silence (1942)
 Love was Married (1943)

Short Stories
 ’’On the Giant's Head’’. The Novel Magazine, July 1915. Reprinted as by Roy Vickers. Detective Story Magazine, 28 October 1919

As David Durham
 Hounded Down (1923)
 The Exploits of Fidelity Dove (1924)
 The Pearl-Headed Pin (1925)
 The Forgotten Honeymoon (1935)

As John Spencer
 The Whispering Death (1932)
 Swell Garrick (1933)

References

External links
 
 Photo taken at Bassano Ltd., 1921, in the collection of the National Portrait Gallery
 Bibliography
 
 

1889 births
1965 deaths
20th-century English male writers
20th-century British novelists
Alumni of Brasenose College, Oxford
British male novelists
English male journalists
English mystery writers
English writers
Members of the Detection Club
People educated at Charterhouse School